The 1972–73 Banks Trophy was the inaugural edition of what is now the Regional Super50, the domestic limited-overs cricket competition for the countries of the West Indies Cricket Board (WICB). It was the only season of the competition to carry that name.

Four teams contested the tournament – Barbados, Guyana, Jamaica, and Trinidad and Tobago. The Combined Islands, the only other team in West Indian domestic cricket at the time, did not participate, as the Windward Islands were playing a multi-day fixture against the touring Australians at the same time. The Banks Trophy was played as a knock-out tournament over a single weekend, from 13 to 15 April 1973. All matches were played at Kensington Oval, in Bridgetown, Barbados, and had a duration of 40 overs. In the tournament final, Barbados narrowly defeated Guyana, winning by only nine runs. A number of players in the Banks Trophy went on to play a key role in the West Indian team that won the inaugural World Cup in 1975.

Teams

Fixtures

Semi-finals

Final

See also
 1972–73 Shell Shield season

References

1973 in West Indian cricket
West Indian cricket seasons from 1970–71 to 1999–2000
Regional Super50 seasons
Domestic cricket competitions in 1972–73
April 1973 sports events in North America